Line 1 of the Hangzhou Metro is an arc-shaped rapid transit line running from Xianghu station in western Xiaoshan District to Xiaoshan International Airport in eastern Xiaoshan District, passing through downtown Hangzhou. The line opened on 24 November 2012. It is the oldest in the city's metro network.

Opening timeline

Service routes
  —

Stations

See also
 Hangzhou Metro

Notes

References

01
MTR Corporation
Railway lines opened in 2012
2012 establishments in China
Standard gauge railways in China
Airport rail links in China